Keith Leonard Baker is a Canadian Football League (CFL) former wide receiver who played six seasons for four teams. He was a CFL All Star in 1982. Baker also played one season in the National Football League (NFL).

References

1957 births
Living people
American football wide receivers
Texas Southern Tigers football players
Montreal Alouettes players
Hamilton Tiger-Cats players
Ottawa Rough Riders players
Toronto Argonauts players
American players of Canadian football
Canadian football wide receivers
Philadelphia Eagles players
African-American players of Canadian football
Players of American football from Dallas
Players of Canadian football from Dallas
21st-century African-American people
20th-century African-American sportspeople